Cohort or cohortes may refer to:

 Cohort (educational group), a group of students working together through the same academic curriculum
 Cohort (floating point), a set of different encodings of the same numerical value
 Cohort (military unit), the basic tactical unit of a Roman legion
 Cohort (statistics), a group of subjects with a common defining characteristic, for example age group
 Cohort (taxonomy), in biology, one of the taxonomic ranks
 Cohort study, a form of longitudinal study used in medicine and social science
 Cohort analysis, a subset of behavioral analytics that takes the data from a given data set 
 Cohort Studios, a video game development company
 Generational cohort, an aggregation of individuals who experience the same event within the same time interval
 "Cohort", a disc golf putter by Infinite Discs

Cohortes 
 Cohortes urbanae, the riot police of Ancient Rome, also pressed into use as a military unit
 Cohortes vigilum, the firefighters and police of Ancient Rome